Audea paulumnodosa is a moth of the family Erebidae first described by Lars Kühne in 2005. It is found in Burkina Faso, Cameroon, Ethiopia, Ghana, Ivory Coast, Mauritania, Nigeria, Senegal, Sudan, the Gambia and Uganda.

References

Moths described in 2005
Audea
Moths of Africa